Augsburg Hauptbahnhof is the main railway station in the Bavarian city of Augsburg, situated in southern Germany. It is classified by Deutsche Bahn as a category 2 station and has 12 platform tracks.

The station has one of the oldest still existing station halls in Germany, which was built from 1843 to 1846 after plans by architect Eduard Rüber. It was reconstructed in 1869 according to Friedrich Bürklein's plans. The station today serves as the central railway hub for the Augsburg metropolitan area and Bavarian Swabia. It is currently being modernised and an underground tram station is being built under it.

Structure

The first Augsburg station was opened in 1840 by the Munich-Augsburg Railway Company (München-Augsburger Eisenbahn-Gesellschaft) near the Rotes Tor (Red Gate). Its historic hall served in 1880 as a military riding school and since 1920 it has been part of the main workshop of the traffic branch of Stadtwerke Augsburg (Augsburg's municipal utility). After the nationalisation of the line in 1846, the current station was built. Augsburg Hauptbahnhof is a through station with four central platforms (which each have two faces and are not accessible for the disabled), nine through tracks and six bay platform tracks (only three of which are in use). Platform 1 is located next to the station building and has one side.

Station building

The station building has three parts. The central block has a station hall with electronic displays, ticket machines, an information booth and waiting facilities. In one wing is the customer centre of Deutsche Bahn, including a ticket office. In the other wing there is a dining and shopping area and the station library.

The last major renovation and modernisation of the building was in 1983/84. In recent years, the food court in particular has been upgraded (completed in 2007) and a new digital display board has been installed in the main hall. Recently, the south wing was renovated, including the waiting area for travellers, and the hospitality facilities have continued to grow.

Due to the construction of a new tramway station beyond the railway, the station building main wing is closed since 2017. It is filled up with supporting struts to avoid a collapse during the drill through of the tunnels.

Station environment

Directly in front of the building there was a large forecourt with a fountain, a parking lot, including a taxi rank, and a bus station for local buses. Since 2014 the square is used by the construction crew of the tramway tunnels. The fountain is put in storage until redesign of the square. The square is flanked on both sides by shopping centres: on the one hand there is the Helio-Quarter, which shall be opened in 2019, on the other, the Bohus-Center and the InterCityHotel.

West of the passenger station is the freight yard and the former marshalling yard, which is now hardly used. To the south was the former "internal loading area". Also in the southern part of the station building is the original central signalling centre inaugurated in May 1972.

Operations

Long-distance services

Augsburg station forms the end of one of the busiest long-distance lines in Germany, the Munich–Augsburg high speed line. Work on upgrading the line as a four-track high-speed line was completed in December 2011. Besides Intercity, EuroCity and CityNightLine services, Intercity-Express (ICE) trains run from Munich towards Stuttgart and Nuremberg. 
	
With the opening of the Nuremberg–Ingolstadt–Munich high-speed line in June 2006 and its full integration into the German ICE network at the timetable change in December 2006, some of the ICE services—30 of 120 long-distance services then stopping in Augsburg—were transferred from Augsburg to Ingolstadt. 

In 2006, about 10,000 passengers per day were recorded on long-distance services in Augsburg. With 90 long-distance services stopping each day, it is the third most important station in Bavaria in terms of long-distance services.
 
The following long-distance services stop in Augsburg:

In the summer of 1939 timetable, 87 scheduled long-distance services each day stopped in the station.

From 17 June 2021 until the timetable change in December 2021, the Flixtrain FLX 35N train pair from Munich to Leipzig and back also served Augsburg.

Regional services

Regional-Express or Regionalbahn services operate from Augsburg to Bad Wörishofen, Donauwörth, Füssen, Hergatz, Ingolstadt, Landsberg, Lindau, Munich, Nuremberg, Oberstdorf, Schongau, Treuchtlingen, Ulm and Weilheim. Especially on the line to Munich there are regularly crowded trains, so double-decker trains, which could carry nearly 1,000 passengers, were used until the timetable change on 13 December 2009. Since then class 440 (Alstom Coradia Continental) EMUs of the so-called Fugger-Express operate S-Bahn-density regional services between Augsburg and Munich. Numerous technical glitches on the new rolling stock delayed the start of the original services for a whole year.

Buses and trams
Augsburg station serves as one of the central hubs of Augsburg, so many lines of the Augsburger Verkehrsverbunde (Augsburg Transport Association) start and end here. These can be accessed in two places. The Hauptbahnhof stop is in the nearby Halderstraße and is served by the following tram and bus lines:
Tram : towards Stadtbergen, Pfersee or Königsplatz, University and Haunstetten Inninger Strasse
Tram : towards Königsplatz, Oberhausen and Augsburg Nord
Tram : towards Königsplatz, Hochzoll and Friedberg West
Bus route  and : towards Firnhaberau
Bus route : towards Klinikum BKH or Königsplatz and Zoo/ Botanical Garden
Bus route : towards Diakonissenhaus or Anna-Hintermayr-Stift
Night bus route : towards Steppach, Bergen, Leitershofen, Königsplatz and Oberhausen
Night bus route : towards Lechhausen, Hammerschmiede and Firnhaberau or Königsplatz and Hochzoll/Süd

All these lines except line , which is operated by the Storz company, are operated by the Augsburger Verkehrsgesellschaft (Augsburg Transport Company).

On the station forecourt there is a bus station with several bus platforms. A total of 22 regional bus lines, operating in all directions, start or end here.

Notes

References

External links

Construction work information of Deutsche Bahn 

Hauptbahnhof
Registered historic buildings and monuments in Bavaria
Railway stations in Germany opened in 1846